If I Could Fly is the debut album by British dance music act Grace, consisting of DJs Paul Oakenfold and Steve Osborne, and jazz singer Dominique Atkins. It was released in 1996 and features their six hit singles; "Not Over Yet", "I Want to Live", "Skin on Skin", "Down to Earth", "If I Could Fly" and "Hand in Hand".

Critical reception
J.D. Considine from The Baltimore Sun declared the album as "one of the season's most satisfying dance releases." He added, "As usual with Oakenfold and Osborne, the music is tuneful and insistent, buoyed by relentless beats but blessed with enough melodic content to keep mind and body engaged."

Track listing
"Not Over Yet" – 5:59
"Down to Earth" – 6:21
"If I Could Fly" – 4:45
"One Day" – 4:49
"You Don't Know" – 6:18
"Orange" – 6:52
"Hand in Hand" – 3:45
"Love Songs" – 4:22
"Don't Call Me (You're Not Mine)" – 5:23
"Mineral" – 4:44
"Skin on Skin" – 5:31
"I Want to Live" – 5:56

References

External links
 If I Could Fly at Discogs

1996 debut albums
Electronic dance music albums by English artists